Juan Pablo Vojvoda Rizzo (born January 13, 1975) is an Argentine football manager and former player who played as a central defender. He is the current head coach of Brazilian club Fortaleza.

Playing career
Born in General Baldissera but raised in Cruz Alta, Vojvoda joined Newell's Old Boys' youth setup at the age of 14. He made his senior debut with the main squad in 1995, and went on to feature regularly in the following seven seasons, never establishing himself as a regular starter.

In 2002 Vojvoda moved abroad, after signing for Segunda División side SD Compostela on loan for one year. He stayed in the country for the following six seasons, representing Algeciras CF, Cultural y Deportiva Leonesa and CD Baza.

Vojvoda returned to his home country on 15 July 2009, joining Tiro Federal of the Primera B Nacional. He subsequently played for Sportivo Belgrano and Sarmiento de Leones, retiring with the latter in 2013 at the age of 38.

Managerial career
Shortly after retiring Vojvoda took up coaching, being in charge of the youth categories of his first club Newell's. On 10 July 2015, he was named manager of the club's reserve side. He was also an interim manager of the first team for two occasions: in 2016 and in 2017.

On 7 October 2017, Vojvoda was named manager of Defensa y Justicia. The following 28 May, he was named at the helm of Talleres de Córdoba.

In May 2019, Vojvoda was appointed manager of Club Atlético Huracán for the 2019–20 season. Sacked on 16 September, he took over Chilean Primera División side Unión La Calera on 30 December.

Vojvoda led La Calera to the second position of the 2020 Chilean Primera División, qualifying the club to the Copa Libertadores for the first time in their history. On 18 February 2021, he left on a mutual agreement.

On 4 May 2021, Vojvoda was appointed head coach of Campeonato Brasileiro Série A club Fortaleza.

Personal life
Born in Argentina, Vojvoda is of Croatian and Italian descent, and holds an Italian passport.

Career statistics

Managerial statistics

Honours

Manager
Fortaleza
Campeonato Cearense: 2021, 2022
Copa do Nordeste: 2022

References

External links

1975 births
Living people
Argentine footballers
Argentine football managers
Argentine people of Croatian descent
Argentine people of Italian descent
Association football defenders
Argentine Primera División players
Primera Nacional players
Newell's Old Boys footballers
Tiro Federal footballers
Sportivo Belgrano footballers
Segunda División players
Segunda División B players
Tercera División players
SD Compostela footballers
Algeciras CF footballers
Cultural Leonesa footballers
Argentine expatriate footballers
Argentine expatriate sportspeople in Spain
Expatriate footballers in Spain
Argentine Primera División managers
Newell's Old Boys managers
Defensa y Justicia managers
Talleres de Córdoba managers
Club Atlético Huracán managers
Unión La Calera managers
Fortaleza Esporte Clube managers
Argentine expatriate football managers
Argentine expatriate sportspeople in Chile
Expatriate football managers in Chile
Argentine expatriate sportspeople in Brazil
Expatriate football managers in Brazil